Kingweston is a village and civil parish in Somerset, England, situated on top of Combe Hill,  north east of Somerton in the South Somerset district.  The village has a population of 128. keinton mandeville is on top of combe hill kingweston is on the approach

History

The village's name was Chinwardestune in the Domesday Book of 1086. There is evidence of Romano-British occupation in Copley Wood.

After the Norman Conquest the manor was given to Eustance, Count of Bologne and held by his family until a descendant gave it to Bermondsey Abbey in 1114, who held the manor until the Dissolution of the monasteries. It then passed to the Smyth family of Long Ashton until it was bought in 1740 by Caleb Dickinson.

The parish was part of the hundred of Catsash.

Governance

The parish council has responsibility for local issues, including setting an annual precept (local rate) to cover the council's operating costs and producing annual accounts for public scrutiny. The parish council evaluates local planning applications and works with the local police, district council officers, and neighbourhood watch groups on matters of crime, security, and traffic. The parish council's role also includes initiating projects for the maintenance and repair of parish facilities, as well as consulting with the district council on the maintenance, repair, and improvement of highways, drainage, footpaths, public transport, and street cleaning. Conservation matters (including trees and listed buildings) and environmental issues are also the responsibility of the council.

The village falls within the Non-metropolitan district of South Somerset, which was formed on 1 April 1974 under the Local Government Act 1972, having previously been part of Langport Rural District. The district council is responsible for local planning and building control, local roads, council housing, environmental health, markets and fairs, refuse collection and recycling, cemeteries and crematoria, leisure services, parks, and tourism.

Somerset County Council is responsible for running the largest and most expensive local services such as education, social services, libraries, main roads, public transport, policing and fire services, trading standards, waste disposal and strategic planning.

It is also part of the Somerton and Frome county constituency represented in the House of Commons of the Parliament of the United Kingdom. It elects one Member of Parliament (MP) by the first past the post system of election.

Geography

Kingweston Meadows is a biological Site of Special Scientific Interest providing an example of an unimproved herb-rich neutral grassland of a type which is now rare in Britain.

Landmarks

Kingweston House was built on the site of a previous Tudor House, but the current building was erected by the Dickinson family in the 19th century. Since 1946 it has been part of Millfield School.

Religious sites

The parish Church of All Saints retains some medieval fragments, but was largely rebuilt by Charles Edmund Giles between 1852 and 1855.

References

External links

Kingweston Photographs, history and information about Kingweston
Dickinson papers 1675-1849 Records from the Dickinson papers

Villages in South Somerset
Civil parishes in Somerset